Justin Michael Fitzpatrick (born 21 November 1973) is an Irish former rugby union player who most recently was head coach of the Houston SaberCats of Major League Rugby (MLR). He previously played for London Irish, Castres Olympique, Dungannon RFC & Ulster. He had also held several other coaching positions, including head coach of Dungannon RFC and the Seattle Saracens, and assistant coach of the United States national rugby union team.

Playing career
Fitzpatrick made his debut for the senior Ireland team in a 13–37 defeat against South Africa on 13 June 1998 going on to win 26 caps. Fitzpatrick was also a prominent member of the Ulster squad that was the first Irish team to win the 1998-99 Heineken Cup, defeating Colomiers 21–6 in the final before 49,500 fans at Lansdowne Road in Dublin. While a professional player at Ulster he helped Willie Anderson's Dungannon RFC side win Ulster's first All-Ireland League (AIL) title in 2001 beating favorites Cork Constitution in the final. During Fitzpatrick's first season at Castres Olympique he helped the club win the Coupe de France in 2003 beating CS Bourgoin-Jallieu 27-26 in the Final. In the 2005-06 season after returning from playing in France with Castres Olympique he helped Mark McCall Ulster side win the Celtic League now the Pro12

Fitzpatrick retired from playing with Ulster with a career ending injury in 2010.

Coaching

Ireland
Fitzpatrick went on to coach Dungannon RFC guiding them to win the Ulster Senior League twice and the Ulster Senior Cup which was the first time in Dungannon RFC history that the club had won the 'Double'. Fitzpatrick also took Dungannon RFC to their first All-Ireland Cup Final, losing a closely contested match against Bruff Rugby Union Football Club 24-18. Alongside fostering a winning culture and professional atmosphere, Fitzpatrick had great success in identifying, recruiting and developing talent during his stay at Dungannon RFC, with such players as Craig Gilroy, Paddy Jackson, Chris Cochrane, Ali Birch & Stuart McCloskey being products of the Dungannon RFC pipeline all of which went on to become professional players. During his tenure in charge at Dungannon RFC Fitzpatrick was invited to join Philip Doyle staff as an assistant coach for the Irish women's national team helping them build a strong scrum.

Pakistan

During the summer of 2012 Fitzpatrick was hired as Head Coach of the Pakistan national rugby union team for the HSBC Asian 5 Nations in Kuala Lumpur.

United States
At the start of 2013, Fitzpatrick relocated to Seattle, United States, to become Head Coach of Seattle Saracens then known as Seattle OPSB. During his first spring season, Fitzpatrick guided the club to USA Rugby Elite Cup semifinal and a USA Rugby Division 1 final in XV's, and assisted Waisale Serevi and Ben Gollings guide the club to win National 7's title. Fitzpatrick continues to show an eye for identifying promising talent and has helped identify and nurture players to become internationals, including Olive Kilifi, John Cullen, Matt Trouville, Ben Landry and Tim Stanfill.

Fitzpatrick has been an assistant coach for the U.S. national rugby team since 2013, helping the team qualify, prepare and compete in the 2015 Rugby World Cup.

In Spring 2017, Fitzpatrick was recruited by the Houston SaberCats to become their Head Coach and build Houston’s first professional rugby team to compete in the inaugural season of Major League Rugby. On 2 May 2019 Fitzpatrick resigned.

References

External links
Ulster profile

1973 births
Living people
Dungannon RFC players
English rugby union coaches
English rugby union players
Houston SaberCats coaches
Ireland international rugby union players
Irish Exiles rugby union players
London Irish players
Rugby union players from Chichester
Ulster Rugby players